The choir wall of Chartres Cathedral (French - clôture de chœur or tour du chœur) is a piece of stone architecture and sculpture in Chartres Cathedral, over 6 metres tall and around 100 metres long. It was commissioned right at the start of the 16th century by Jehan de Beauce to keep the laity out of the liturgical choir. 

It marked a transition between Gothic art and the French Renaissance in what became known as the Louis XII style.  Since 1862 the whole wall and each of its constituent parts have been listed as monuments historiques.

Levels
It is divided into four horizontal levels - base, clerestory, niches and pinnacles.

Base 
The lowest level consists of varied architectural decoration in Louis XII style, though the stylobates below classical-style medallions and the pointed squares draw on the Louis XI style.

Clerestory 
Since six bas-reliefs by Charles-Antoine Bridan were placed inside the choir at the end of the 18th century, this level has been obscured by plaster. The upper part made up of niches and pinnacles is still wholly in the Flamboyant Gothic style, but the level uses the very un-medieval features of arabesque pilasters instead of ogives.

Niches 
This consists of forty sculpted groups on the lives of the Virgin Mary and Jesus. Each group is numbered 1 to 40 below the niches. Some of the groups have a plaque mentioning the sculptor or a caption in Gothic script identifying the scene.

The forty groups are grouped into fifteen sections. The eight sections around the choir proper include a total of 29 scenes, including the double scene in the twelfth section (Raising of the Cross) - each section usually has four scenes, except the third section with the astronomical clock. The apse has eleven scenes - six of its sections consist of two scenes each, whilst scene 21 in the ninth section is a double-scene (Entry into Jerusalem). No scenes appear on the 'axial' or 'roundabout' section.

List

Astronomical clock 
A 1528 astronomical clock by an unknown clockmaker is located on the south side after the Visitation scene, at the start of the third section, which thus only has two scenes (Joseph's Dream and Nativity). The original mechanism was replaced by an electrical system in 2009.

Statuary 
The columns between the spans hold statues, around 1.6m tall, all by Thomas Boudin, showing God the Father, Fulbert and other unidentified bishops of Chartres. There are also another 84 smaller statues at various levels, between 35 cm and 60 cm tall - the original plan seemed to be to show figures from society and envisaged 136 of these smaller statues.

Pinnacles 
This is made up of several architectural features such as stone baldachins, appearing like stone lace. It was built section by section with the corresponding groups and thus took more than 200 years to complete.

References

External links 
 

Chartres Cathedral
Sculptures in France
French Renaissance
Statues of Jesus
Sculptures of Saint Joseph
Statues of the Virgin Mary
Sculptures depicting John the Baptist
Chartres